The Central constituency (No.11) is a Russian legislative constituency in Dagestan. The constituency stretches alongside Caspian Sea from Makhachkala to the border with Azerbaijan. The constituency was created in 2003 from parts of Buynaksk constituency.

Members elected

Election results

2003

|-
! colspan=2 style="background-color:#E9E9E9;text-align:left;vertical-align:top;" |Candidate
! style="background-color:#E9E9E9;text-align:left;vertical-align:top;" |Party
! style="background-color:#E9E9E9;text-align:right;" |Votes
! style="background-color:#E9E9E9;text-align:right;" |%
|-
|style="background-color:"|
|align=left|Asanbuba Nyudyurbegov
|align=left|Independent
|
|62.96%
|-
|style="background-color:"|
|align=left|Magomed Omarov
|align=left|Independent
|
|31.59%
|-
|style="background-color:"|
|align=left|Abdulkerim Magomedov
|align=left|Independent
|
|1.80%
|-
|style="background-color:"|
|align=left|Kamaldin Mursalov
|align=left|Independent
|
|0.85%
|-
|style="background-color:#00A1FF"|
|align=left|Abdulmedzhid Bagomayev
|align=left|Party of Russia's Rebirth-Russian Party of Life
|
|0.67%
|-
|style="background-color:#000000"|
|colspan=2 |against all
|
|1.15%
|-
| colspan="5" style="background-color:#E9E9E9;"|
|- style="font-weight:bold"
| colspan="3" style="text-align:left;" | Total
| 
| 100%
|-
| colspan="5" style="background-color:#E9E9E9;"|
|- style="font-weight:bold"
| colspan="4" |Source:
|
|}

2016

|-
! colspan=2 style="background-color:#E9E9E9;text-align:left;vertical-align:top;" |Candidate
! style="background-color:#E9E9E9;text-align:left;vertical-align:top;" |Party
! style="background-color:#E9E9E9;text-align:right;" |Votes
! style="background-color:#E9E9E9;text-align:right;" |%
|-
|style="background-color: " |
|align=left|Abdulgamid Emirgamzayev
|align=left|United Russia
|
|88.86%
|-
|style="background-color:"|
|align=left|Makhmud Makhmudov
|align=left|Communist Party
|
|5.25%
|-
|style="background-color:"|
|align=left|Murat Payzulayev
|align=left|A Just Russia
|
|1.67%
|-
|style="background-color:"|
|align=left|Islamutdin Vagabov
|align=left|The Greens
|
|1.63%
|-
|style="background-color:"|
|align=left|Timur Saidov
|align=left|Communists of Russia
|
|0.87%
|-
|style="background-color:"|
|align=left|Mazhi Sultanov
|align=left|Liberal Democratic Party
|
|0.75%
|-
|style="background-color:"|
|align=left|Islam Klichkhanov
|align=left|Yabloko
|
|0.48%
|-
| colspan="5" style="background-color:#E9E9E9;"|
|- style="font-weight:bold"
| colspan="3" style="text-align:left;" | Total
| 
| 100%
|-
| colspan="5" style="background-color:#E9E9E9;"|
|- style="font-weight:bold"
| colspan="4" |Source:
|
|}

2021

|-
! colspan=2 style="background-color:#E9E9E9;text-align:left;vertical-align:top;" |Candidate
! style="background-color:#E9E9E9;text-align:left;vertical-align:top;" |Party
! style="background-color:#E9E9E9;text-align:right;" |Votes
! style="background-color:#E9E9E9;text-align:right;" |%
|-
|style="background-color:"|
|align=left|Murad Gadzhiyev
|align=left|United Russia
|
|80.20%
|-
|style="background-color:"|
|align=left|Makhmud Makhmudov
|align=left|Communist Party
|
|5.87%
|-
|style="background-color:"|
|align=left|Kamil Davdiyev
|align=left|A Just Russia — For Truth
|
|4.50%
|-
|style="background-color:"|
|align=left|Daniyal Gadzhiyev
|align=left|Liberal Democratic Party
|
|2.77%
|-
|style="background-color: "|
|align=left|Leyla Dzhalilova
|align=left|Party of Pensioners
|
|1.54%
|-
|style="background-color:"|
|align=left|Rinat Karimov
|align=left|Rodina
|
|1.39%
|-
|style="background-color:"|
|align=left|Khadzhimurat Abakarov
|align=left|Yabloko
|
|1.21%
|-
|style="background-color: " |
|align=left|Magomed Shaykhgasanov
|align=left|New People
|
|1.21%
|-
|style="background-color:"|
|align=left|Sirazhdin Ramazanov
|align=left|The Greens
|
|0.66%
|-
| colspan="5" style="background-color:#E9E9E9;"|
|- style="font-weight:bold"
| colspan="3" style="text-align:left;" | Total
| 
| 100%
|-
| colspan="5" style="background-color:#E9E9E9;"|
|- style="font-weight:bold"
| colspan="4" |Source:
|
|}

Notes

References 

Russian legislative constituencies
Politics of Dagestan